I Will Trust is the fourteenth solo album from Contemporary Gospel singer Fred Hammond. The album was released on November 17, 2014 through RCA Records.

Background
I Will Trust sees Fred Hammond freshly inspired after he underwent double knee replacement. Feelings of gratefulness and unswerving trust fill the album, which is jubilant—often to a full-tilt extent—even at its most reflective. Unsurprisingly, there are some nimble and juicy basslines here, as heard throughout "I Believe," "It's Mine," and "You Bless Me Over and Over." Rather amazingly, Hammond supported this album with a 30-city tour alongside Donnie McClurkin.

Track listing

Personnel
Credits adapted from AllMusic.

Fred Hammond - Guitar (Bass), Key Bass, Mixing, Vocals
Lloyd Barry - Horn
Cristin "Cris" Brenham - Keyboards
Autumn Cannon - Vocals (Background)
Kenneth Diggs - Guitar (Bass)
Alan "Snoop" Evans - Guitar (Bass)
Philip Feaster - Keyboards, Strings
Lehman Gray - Vocals (Background)
Noel Hall - Keyboards, Piano
BreeAnn Hammond - Clapping, Crowd Noise, Vocals, Vocals (Background)
Rachel Hammond - Clapping, Crowd Noise, Vocals (Background)
Lawrence Jones - Guitar
Pam Kenyon - Vocals (Background)
Mark Lettieri - Guitar
King Logan - Drums, Keyboards
Shaun Martin - Keyboards
Tiffany McGhee - Vocals (Background)
Destiny McGill - Vocals (Background)
Calvin Rodgers - Drums
Javier Solís - Percussion
Tisha Stratford - Vocals (Background)
The Warehouse Crew - Clapping, Crowd Noise, Vocals (Background)

References

Fred Hammond albums
2014 albums